The Councils of Alexandria started in 231 AD as a council of bishops and priests met at Alexandria, Egypt, called by Bishop Demetrius for the purpose of declaring Origen of Alexandria unworthy of the office of teacher, and of excommunicating him.

Council of 306
In 306, a council held under Pope Peter of Alexandria deposed Meletius, Bishop of Lycopolis, for idolatry and other crimes. The schism then begun by him lasted fifty years and was the source of much trouble for the Church of Egypt.

Council of 321 
In 321 was held the council that first condemned Arius, then parish priest of the section of Alexandria known as Baucalis. After his condemnation Arius withdrew to Palestine, where he secured the powerful support of Eusebius of Caesarea.

Councils of 326-350
At the Council of 326, Athanasius of Alexandria was elected to succeed the aged Alexander, and various heresies and schisms of Egypt were denounced. In 339 or 340, nearly one hundred bishops met at Alexandria, declared in favor of Athanasius, and vigorously rejected the criticisms of the Eusebian faction at Tyre. At a council in 350, St. Athanasius was replaced in his see.

Council of 362
In 362 was held one of the most important of these councils. It was presided over by St. Athanasius and St. Eusebius of Vercelli, and was directed against those who denied the divinity of the Holy Spirit, the human soul of Christ, and God's divinity. Mild measures were agreed on for those apostate bishops who repented, but severe penance was decreed for the chief leaders of the major heresies.

Council of 363
In 363, another council met under St. Athanasius for the purpose of submitting to the new Roman Emperor Jovian an account of the truth faith. Somewhat similar was the purpose of the Council of 364. That of 370 approved the action of Pope Damasus I in condemning Ursacius of Singidunum and Valens of Mursa (see Arianism), and expressed its surprise that Auxentius of Milan was yet tolerated at Milan. In 399, the council of Alexandria condemned, without naming him, the writings of Origen.

The Last Councils
In 430, St. Cyril of Alexandria made known to the bishops of Egypt the letter of Pope Celestine I, in which a pontifical admonition was conveyed to the heresiarch Nestorius. In this council the bishops warned him that unless he retracted his errors, confessed the Catholic faith, and reformed his life, they would refuse to look on him as a bishop. In 633, the patriarch Cyrus of Alexandria held a council in favour of the Monothelites, with which closed the series of these deliberative meetings of the ancient Church of Egypt.

References

External links

History of Christianity in Egypt
Church patriarchs